Kamlesh Dutt Tripathi is an Indian theatre personality and professor emeritus of BHU Varanasi. His interest and expertise spreads from Kutiyattam tradition to Ankiya Nat of Assam, aesthetics. He has contributed to the contemporary practice of classical Sanskrit texts in his tenure as the Chairman of Kalidasa Academy Ujjain. He had associated with Natyasastra scholar and Kutiyattam actor Natyacharya Mani Madhava Chakyar. He was instrumental in understanding and performing the plays by Kalidasa and Bhasa. His writings and translations into Hindi of plays like Balacharita were important in understanding the dramaturgy of Bhasa in the modern context.

Tripathi is regarded to be an authority on Natya Shastra, the Indian treatise on theatre, in terms of its philosophy, aesthetics and techniques and its application in the present context.

References

Living people
Indian Sanskrit scholars
Academic staff of Banaras Hindu University
Year of birth missing (living people)
Recipients of the Sangeet Natak Akademi Fellowship